Hallsville is a place in Montgomery County, New York, in the United States.

History
Hallsville was named for Capt. Robert Hall.

References

Geography of Montgomery County, New York